Keith Short (8 March 1941 – 11 September 2020) was a British sculptor, primarily working within the feature film industry in the UK.

Short has worked on most of the large-scale film productions made in the UK, and helped to create several iconic pieces such as the Batmobile for Tim Burton's Batman, the Ark of the Covenant  and the Golden Fertility Idol  for Steven Spielberg's film Raiders of the Lost Ark, Emperor Palpatine's chair  in Return of the Jedi and the Tree of the Dead  for Sleepy Hollow.

He has been the head of a department of sculptors on many films including Oliver Stone's Alexander, The Mummy, The Mummy Returns, Star Wars: Episode I – The Phantom Menace, Mortal Kombat, The Fifth Element, The Princess Bride, Willow, Highlander and Greystoke - The Legend of Tarzan, Lord of the Apes.

Short studied sculpture at Wolverhampton College of Art and moved to London where he began his career as a stone carver and lettering artist. His early work includes ornate finials for the Henry VII chapel, Westminster Abbey and a relief panel, cast into bronze, of the former Waterloo Bridge, now sited beneath Hungerford Bridge, London. Keith started on feature films in 1978, working on Ridley Scott's Alien and most recently worked on Prometheus, Hugo and Harry Potter and the Deathly Hallows, parts I and II.

Filmography 
 Jack the Giant Slayer
 Dark Shadows
 Prometheus
 Hugo
 Clash of the Titans
 Harry Potter and the Deathly Hallows, parts I and II
 Prince of Persia
 Quantum of Solace
 Agent Crush
 Stormbreaker
 Basic Instinct 2
 Land of the Blind
 Fragile
 Where the Truth Lies
 Stoned
 King Arthur
 Alexander
 Harry Potter and the Prisoner of Azkaban
 Die Another Day
 The Mummy Returns
 Sleepy Hollow
 The Mummy
 Star Wars: Episode I – The Phantom Menace
 Mortal Kombat
 The Saint
 The Fifth Element
 GoldenEye
 Wind in the Willows
 Judge Dredd
 Restoration
 Batman
 High Spirits
 The Adventures of Baron Munchausen
 The Princess Bride
 Willow
 Highlander
 Greystoke - The Legend of Tarzan, Lord of the Apes
 Little Shop of Horrors
 Brazil
 The Dark Crystal
 Young Sherlock Holmes
 Return of the Jedi
 Indiana Jones and the Temple of Doom
 Raiders of the Lost Ark
 Saturn 3
 Life of Brian
 Alien

See also 
 Brian Muir

References

External links 
 Online portfolio and biography
 

1941 births
2020 deaths
20th-century British sculptors
21st-century British sculptors
21st-century male artists
Alumni of the University of Wolverhampton
British male sculptors
People from Wolverhampton
20th-century British male artists
21st-century British male artists